The New York City ePrix is an annual race of the single-seater, electrically powered Formula E championship held in Brooklyn, New York. The inaugural event, the 2017 New York City ePrix, was a two-race event on July 15–16, 2017.

Circuit

The race is on the Brooklyn Street Circuit, an enclosed track that has a bridge crossing the track and 2 grandstands along with the Allianz Village.

Results

Repeat winners (drivers)

References

External links
Official  Website for 2019 Race 11
Official  Website for 2019 Race 12

 
Formula E ePrix
Auto races in the United States
Sports competitions in New York City
Recurring sporting events established in 2017
2017 establishments in New York City